Eucosma similiana is a species of moth of the family Tortricidae. It is found in North America, where it has been recorded from the north-eastern United States and south-eastern Canada. The habitat consists of fields and waste areas.

The length of the forewings is 8.1–11 mm for males and 8.2–10.3 mm for females. The forewings are brown with dark brown L-shaped marking with curved edges. There is a large faint tooth in the subterminal area. The hindwings are dirty white, shading to pale brown towards the outer margin. Adults are on wing from July to September.

The larvae feed on Solidago species. They feed in the rootstalks of their host plant.

Taxonomy
The species was formerly listed as a subspecies of Eucosma dorsisignatana.

References

Moths described in 1860
Eucosmini